Henry Hewes may refer to:

Henry Hewes (critic) (1917–2006), American theater writer for Saturday Review
Henry Hewes (politician) (born 1949), American activist, son of above

See also
Henry Hughes (disambiguation)